Douglas Maurice Terry (born February 10, 1968) is a former professional American football player who played defensive back for four seasons for the Kansas City Chiefs.

References

1969 births
Living people
People from Desha County, Arkansas
People from Liberal, Kansas
Players of American football from Kansas
American football defensive backs
Kansas Jayhawks football players
Kansas City Chiefs players